Haughton is a hamlet in the English county of Nottinghamshire.

Haughton lies on the south bank of the River Maun about one mile south west from Bothamsall (where the population is included). Administratively it forms part of the Bassetlaw district.

See also
Haughton Hall, Nottinghamshire

References

External links

Haughton in Joseph Rodgers, The Scenery of Sherwood Forest with an Account of some Eminent People there, (1908
Haughton in Cornelius Brown, A History of Nottinghamshire, 1896
Haughton in Thoroton's History of Nottinghamshire: republished with large additions by John Throsby, vol III, p359-361, 1790.

Hamlets in Nottinghamshire
Civil parishes in Nottinghamshire
Bassetlaw District